Morning Live is a "topical live series" that airs at 9:15 am on weekdays on BBC One.

Series overview

History
Morning Live first broadcast in October 2020 as a 40-part series to connect with viewers' real-life concerns and to offer trustworthy and expert advice.

The programme returned for a second series in January 2021, following the launch series, which averaged 1,400,000 viewers.  One episode in February 2021, achieved 1,800,000 viewers.

In February 2022, Morning Live moved to a new studio "in the heart of Manchester city centre," more specifically inside the ABC Buildings.

Upon its move to Manchester, Morning Live was averaging 1,200,000 viewers, and was consistently achieving slot-winning figures.

Cast

Presenters

 Kym Marsh
 Gethin Jones
 Sara Cox
 Sam Quek
 Kimberley Walsh
 Rav Wilding

Featured experts

 Matt Allwright: consumer protection expert
 Iona Bain: financial expert
 Oscar Duke: medical expert
 James Greenwood: veterinary expert
 Anna Haugh: food expert
 Will Kirk: restoration expert
 Punam Krishan: medical expert
 Mark Lane: gardening expert
 Dominic Littlewood: consumer protection expert
 Wayne Perrey: DIY expert
 Ranj Singh: medical expert
 Xand van Tulleken: medical expert
 Rav Wilding: security expert

Stand-in presenters

 Michelle Ackerley
 Shirley Ballas
 Sara Davies
 Ashley John-Baptiste
 Jacqui Joseph
 Jeanette Kwakye
 Oti Mabuse
 Janette Manrara
 Sheree Murphy
 AJ Odudu
 Joanna Page
 Katie Thistleton
 Briony May Williams
Helen Skelton

References

External links
 
 

BBC television news shows
2020 British television series debuts
2020s British television series
English-language television shows
Television series by BBC Studios